Don Bosco College was a Roman Catholic seminary located in Newton, New Jersey.

History

Seminary 
When the seminary opened, the campus consisted of the mansion of merchant, leather-goods manufacturer and railroad executive John A. Horton (1807–1858), built in 1857–1858, which became 
the "St. Joseph’s House of Studies" and improved to accommodate class rooms, dormitories, recreation rooms, and study hall to accommodate about fifty novices. In 1930s, ground was broken on an imposing three-story, red-brick building which was dedicated in 1931. Several other academic buildings and a gymnasium were constructed in the 1960s.

Summer camp 
The campus was used in the summers as a camp for boys 8–15 until 1998. From 1991 to 1998, the Salesians leased the campus during the summers for summer camp, keeping that open during those years. The campus consisted of a pond used for swimming (until 1977 when a pool was built), boating, and fishing, and additional camp facilities were located on a hill on top of the campus. The hilltop camp consisted of a chapel, barrack style residential cabins, dining hall, & an outdoor covered area for communal events. Every day the boys would wake early, go to chapel, eat a hot breakfast in the dining hall, and engage in activities including archery, rifle range shooting, horseback riding, and boating. Afternoons included a snack time and theology lectures by the Salesian brothers who ran the camp as well as the similar morning activities. There was a day and resident camp. For resident campers, evenings included an after dinner entertainment consisting of skits or performances by campers or the brothers. An outdoor swimming pool was built in 1977 and used until after the camp's closing in 1998, of at which time it was razed. During the school years the Salesian order hosted Boys' Club for boys 7–15 on Saturdays until 1993 as well.

Present usage 

Since the purchase, the campus has been converted and expanded as the main campus of Sussex County Community College (SCCC), a public two-year county college. Several new buildings have been built on the campus.

References

Salesian colleges and universities
Former Catholic universities and colleges in the United States
[[Category: 
 
]]
Buildings and structures in Sussex County, New Jersey
Educational institutions established in 1928
Educational institutions disestablished in 1991
1991 disestablishments in New Jersey
Newton, New Jersey
Catholic universities and colleges in New Jersey
Universities and colleges in Sussex County, New Jersey
1928 establishments in New Jersey
Seminaries and theological colleges in New Jersey